Absent Friends is the eighth studio album by Irish chamber pop band the Divine Comedy, released in 2004 by Parlophone in the UK and Nettwerk in the U.S. Two singles were released from the album in the UK: "Come Home Billy Bird", which features former Kenickie vocalist Lauren Laverne on vocals, and the album's title track.

Neil Hannon was the only member of the Divine Comedy by this point, as the band had split up shortly after the release of 2001's Regeneration. Hannon had decided to continue using the Divine Comedy name for this album and was aided by long-time collaborator Joby Talbot, who arranged and conducted the orchestra.

The album was recorded at RAK Studios and Konk Studios in London by Guy Massey, with help from Raj Das and Chris Bolster. It was mixed at Mayfair Studios by Nigel Godrich, who was assisted by Dan Grech-Marguerat.

Reception 
Reviewing the album for Pitchfork, Joe Tangari said:
Even if you're resistant to Hannon's grandiosity, it's hard to deny the lush sweep of the album's opening title track, a song that confirms his place as the closest thing to an inheritor of Scott Walker's mantle as we're likely to get. The orchestration is expert and economical, and Nigel Godrich, bumped from the producer's chair to the mixing board this time around, perfectly stacks the song's elements to make them sound absolutely huge. Hannon's tenor is commanding, and he spins an incredible melody as he runs through a series of tributes to 20th century icons whose lives ended prematurely, from French actress Jean Seberg to Laika, the first dog in space.

Track listing
All songs written by Neil Hannon.

Personnel

Millennia Ensemble Musicians
Orchestra arranged and conducted by Joby Talbot.

 Everton Nelson, Charles Mutter, Warren Zielinski, Cath Haggo, Natalia Bonner, Giles Broadbent, Rick Koster, Matthew Scrivener, Alison Dods, Darragh Morgan, Richard George, Steve Hussey, Timothy Myall, Helena Wood, John Smart, Maya Bickel, Jenny Sacha - Violin
 Vince Greene, Adrian Smith, Louise Hogan, Reiad Chibah, Dan Cornford - Viola
 Chris Worsey, Ian Burdge, Nick Holland, Christopher Fish - Cello
 Lucy Shaw, Bev Jones - Double Bass
 Daniel Newell, Tom Rees-Roberts - Trumpet
 James 'Spaddy' Adams, Mike Kearsey - Trombone
 Matt Gunner, Simon Morgan - French Horn
 Nick Cartledge - Flute
 Chris Richards - Clarinet
 Dominic Kelly - Oboe
 Jo Cackett, Gareth Newman - Bassoon
 Jay Craig - Saxophone
 Lucy Wakeford - Harp

Additional Musicians
 Miggy Barradas – drums on tracks 2, 4, 8 & 11
 Rob Farrer – percussion on tracks 1, 3, 4, 6, 7 & 8
 Simon Little – double bass on track 8
 Crispin Robinson – congas on tracks 4 & 8
 Joby Talbot – plucked piano on track 9
 Matt Gunner – horn solo on track 9
 Everton Nelson – violin solo on track 10
 Nick Cartledge – flute solo on track 8

Technical Personnel
 Neil Hannon – performer, producer, arranger
 Guy Massey – recording
 Nigel Godrich – mixing
 Dan Marguerat – additional mixing

Guest performers
 Lauren Laverne – vocals on "Come Home Billy Bird"
 Yann Tiersen – accordion on "Sticks & Stones"

References

2004 albums
The Divine Comedy (band) albums
Parlophone albums